Christina "Tina" Riegel (born 25 August 1965 in Stuttgart, Germany) is a former German figure skater who competed in pair skating and ladies singles at the 1980 Winter Olympics.

With partner Andreas Nischwitz, Riegel won the gold medal at the German Figure Skating Championships three straight years, beginning in 1979.  They finished eighth at the 1980 Olympics, when Riegel was just 14 years old, and the following year, the pair won the silver medal at the European Figure Skating Championships and the bronze at the World Figure Skating Championships.

Riegel also won the bronze medal at the German Nationals in ladies singles in 1980 and 1981.  She finished 18th at the 1980 Olympics and 19th at that year's World Championships.

Results

Single skating

Pair skating with Nischwitz

References
 
 

1965 births
German female pair skaters
German female single skaters
Olympic figure skaters of West Germany
Sportspeople from Stuttgart
Figure skaters at the 1980 Winter Olympics
Living people
World Figure Skating Championships medalists
European Figure Skating Championships medalists